During the 1908–09 season Hibernian, a football club based in Edinburgh, finished sixth out of 18 clubs in the Scottish First Division.

Scottish First Division

Final League table

Scottish Cup

See also
List of Hibernian F.C. seasons

References

Notes

External links
Hibernian 1908/1909 results and fixtures, Soccerbase

Hibernian F.C. seasons
Hibernian